Prajogo Pangestu in 1944, is an Indonesian business magnate, investor, and philanthropist. He owns and founded Barito Pacific Group which engages in forestry, petrochemicals, property, plantation, oil and gas, coal and gold mining, as well as geothermal. In 2019, he was ranked as the 3rd richest person in Indonesia by Forbes.

Biography 
Pangestu was born on May 13, 1944 in Bengkayang, West Kalimantan, to a Hakka family from Guangdong, China. He attended Chinese schools in Indonesia and moved to Jakarta in 1965. In 1970, Pangestu joined Burhan Uray's timber company Djajanti Group and was appointed by Uray as general manager of PT Nusantara in 1976. He left Djajanti in 1977 and launched his own business.

One of the companies controlled by Prajogo, PT Barito Pacific Timber Tbk, as of 1993 was the largest company on the Jakarta Stock Exchange. In 2007, the company dropped the word "Timber" to reflect the diversified scope of its businesses.

Aside from PT Barito Pacific Tbk which controls Indonesia's largest petrochemical producer, PT Chandra Asri Petrochemicals Tbk, Prajogo Pangestu also controls Star Energy, one of the largest oil & gas, as well as geothermal company in Indonesia. Both Chandra Asri and Star Energy remain as the two main business subsidiaries of Barito Pacific.

As of 2009, Barito Pacific also owns the Transpacific Group, which has an 80% stake in Transpacific Railway Infrastructure.

In March 2022, it was ammounced that Green Era, a private Singapore-based company controlled by Pangestu, purchased 33.33% of Star Energy from Thailand’s BCPG for $440 million. Pangestu already owned 66.6% of Jakarta-headquartered Star Energy, and the recent purchase gives Pangestu full control of Star Energy.

References

1944 births
Living people
Indonesian company founders
Indonesian people of Chinese descent
People from West Kalimantan
Businesspeople in timber
Indonesian billionaires